The 1997–98 CHL season was the sixth season of the Central Hockey League (CHL).

Regular season

Division standings

y - clinched league title; x - clinched playoff spot; e - eliminated from playoff contention

Playoffs

Playoff bracket

CHL awards

External links
 1997–98 CHL season at The Internet Hockey Database

Chl Season, 1997-98
Central Hockey League seasons